This is a list of foreign ministers in 1990.

Africa

Asia

Australia and Oceania

Europe

North America and the Caribbean

South America

1990 in international relations
Foreign ministers
1990